The Pill of Immortality was an elixir or pill sought by Chinese alchemists to confer physical or spiritual immortality. The search for the pill was started several centuries BC, and continued until 500 AD and was often based on gold. Its search was supported by the emperors and the nobility of China, with a strong tradition in Taoism.  The alchemical tradition in China was divided into two differing schools in the search for the pill of immortality. Taoist sects which advocated the attainment of immortality by consuming substances were very popular during the Eastern Han dynasty in the 2nd century AD and they were collectively known as the School of the External Pill.  "Internal alchemy" was thought to create the "immortal body" within the corporeal body, and a variety of actions involving dietary, respiratory, and sexual practices and/or mental practices such as meditation were believed to cause immortality.

In the Liexian Zhuan a tradition is preserved of a man named Wei Boyang who had made a pill of Immortality. Texts dating from the 4th century AD and later, present the legendary Yellow Emperor near the end of his reign as finding the pill in Huang Shan mountain range and he establishes the seventy-two peaks of the mountains as the dwelling place for the immortals.

See also 
 Ambrosia
 Amrita, of Hindu mythology, a drink which confers immortality on the gods, and a cognate of ambrosia
 Elixir of life, a potion sought by alchemy to produce immortality
 Ichor, blood of the Greek gods, related to ambrosia
 Iðunn's apples in Norse mythology
 Manna, food given by God to the Israelites
 Peaches of Immortality in Chinese mythology
 Silphium
 Soma (drink), a ritual drink of importance among the early Indo-Iranians, and the subsequent Vedic and greater Persian cultures
 Eucharist
 Sacramental bread
 Sacramental wine
 Holy water

References

Alchemical substances
Immortality